The Majors: Pro Baseball is a baseball video game for Sega Game Gear. It features battery-based save and a Major League Baseball Players Association license.

Summary
The teams themselves are not licensed and are only listed by city name. The umpire's calls are notable for being uttered with a Japanese accent. The game contains a season mode. Players cannot choose a pitch but they are delivered clearly and accurately in terms of realism (for the era that the game was released in).

Players can play a regular season lasting anywhere from 32 to 162 games. After every game, the regular season can be saved for future purposes. This video games uses the rosters from the 1991 Major League Baseball season and allows players to create their own teams; using players from that roster.

Reception
Allgame gave this game a 3 out of 5 rating in its overview.

References
 The Majors: Pro Baseball at GameFAQs
 The Majors: Pro Baseball at allgame

Sega video games
Game Gear games
Game Gear-only games
Major League Baseball video games
1992 video games
North America-exclusive video games
Video games set in 1991
Multiplayer and single-player video games
Video games developed in Japan